Glenn Curtiss Patrick (born April 26, 1950) is an American former professional ice hockey player who played 38 games in the National Hockey League and 23 games in the World Hockey Association between 1973 and 1977.  He played with the St. Louis Blues, California Golden Seals, Cleveland Barons, and Edmonton Oilers. Patrick was also a member of the United States national team at the 1978 Ice Hockey World Championship tournament. His father Lynn Patrick, older brother Craig Patrick, grandfather Lester Patrick and granduncle Frank Patrick are all former professional players and managers and members of the Hockey Hall of Fame. Patrick was born in New York City, New York, but grew up in Wellesley, Massachusetts. Patrick graduated from Ladue High School in Ladue Missouri in 1968.

Glenn Patrick coached the minor league Wilkes-Barre/Scranton Penguins and Peoria Prancers after retiring from pro hockey in 1980.

Patrick is currently married.

Career statistics

Regular season and playoffs

International

External links

1950 births
Living people
American men's ice hockey defensemen
California Golden Seals players
Cleveland Barons (NHL) players
Columbus Golden Seals players
Denver Pioneers men's ice hockey players
Denver Spurs (WHL) players
Edmonton Oilers (WHA) players
Hampton Gulls (AHL) players
Hershey Bears players
Ice hockey players from Massachusetts
Kansas City Blues players
People from Wellesley, Massachusetts
Salt Lake Golden Eagles (CHL) players
St. Louis Blues players
Undrafted National Hockey League players
Wilkes-Barre/Scranton Penguins head coaches